, son of Hisamichi, was a kugyō or Japanese court noble of the late Muromachi period (1336–1573). He held a regent position kampaku from 1525 to 1533 and from 1536 to 1542. Sakihisa was his son. He had a daughter, Keifukuin Kaoku Gyokuei, who wrote poetry and commentary on the Tale of Genji. A daughter of his was a consort of shōgun Ashikaga Yoshiteru.

References

|-

Fujiwara clan
Konoe family
1503 births
1566 deaths